Palmers is an unincorporated community in Duluth Township, Saint Louis County, Minnesota, United States; located on the North Shore of Lake Superior.

The community is located 16 miles northeast of the city of Duluth, at the junction of North Shore Scenic Drive (County 61) and Homestead Road (County Road 42).  Stoney Point is in the area.

The boundary line between Saint Louis and Lake counties is nearby.

References

 Rand McNally Road Atlas – 2007 edition – Minnesota entry
 Official State of Minnesota Highway Map – 2011/2012 edition

Unincorporated communities in Minnesota
Unincorporated communities in St. Louis County, Minnesota